Klub Sepakbola Tiga Naga (also known as KS Tiga Naga) is an Indonesian football club based in Kampar Regency, Riau. Their homebase is Tuanku Tambusai Stadium.

History
They entering 2019 Liga 3 Pre-national Route replacing other club from Riau, AS Abadi, that withdrew from the competition.

On 26 December 2019, Tiga Naga promoted to Liga 2 after won at last match against Persidi Idi in Third Round National Phase and for this season, the club using AS Abadi Tiga Naga (AA Tiga Naga) because KS Tiga Naga already registered on PSSI membership.

Stadium
Actually, KS Tiga Naga homebase is Tumpal Sinaga Stadium in Pekanbaru.
Because the stadium did not qualify the verification for held a matches for Liga 2, they decided to move their homebase to Tuanku Tambusai Stadium in Bangkinang, the capital of Kampar Regency.

Sponsors

Kit Sponsors
 2019: Curva Sport
 2020: Maknorukun
 2021: Days Apparel

Coaching staff

References

External links

Football clubs in Indonesia
Football clubs in Riau
Association football clubs established in 2015
2015 establishments in Indonesia